Casey Bannerman (4 November 1987) is a basketball artist based in Toronto, Ontario, Canada. Bannerman has collaborated with National Basketball Association (NBA) athletes including Toronto Raptors point guard Fred VanVleet.

References 

Living people
1987 births
Artists from Toronto
National Basketball Association mass media
21st-century Canadian male artists